Iolaus is a genus of butterflies in the family Lycaenidae. The genera Argiolaus, Epamera, Iolaphilus and Stugeta are often included in Iolaus. Iolaus species are found in the Afrotropical realm.There are ca. 130 species in Iolaus

Species
. 
Subgenus Iolaus Hübner, [1819]
Iolaus bilineata Bethune-Baker, 1908
Iolaus bolissus Hewitson, 1873
Iolaus carina Hewitson, 1873
Iolaus eurisus (Cramer, [1780])
Subgenus Epamera Druce, 1891
Iolaus adorabilis Collins & Larsen, 2008
Iolaus aemulus Trimen, 1895
Iolaus aethes Clench, 1965
Iolaus aethria Karsch, 1893
Iolaus agnes Aurivillius, 1898
Iolaus alienus (Trimen, 1898)
Iolaus apatosa (Stempffer, 1952)
Iolaus aphnaeoides Trimen, 1873
Iolaus arborifera (Butler, 1901)
Iolaus aurivillii Röber, 1900
Iolaus australis Stevenson, 1937
Iolaus bakeri (Riley, 1928)
Iolaus bamptoni (Congdon & Collins, 1998)
Iolaus banco Stempffer, 1966
Iolaus bansana Bethune-Baker, 1926
Iolaus belli Hewitson, 1869 (status unclear)
Iolaus bellina (Plötz, 1880)
Iolaus coelestis Bethune-Baker, 1926
Iolaus congdoni (Kielland, 1985)
Iolaus creta Hewitson, 1878
Iolaus cytaeis Hewitson, 1875
Iolaus diametra Karsch, 1895
Iolaus djaloni Collins & Larsen, 1998
Iolaus dubiosa (Stempffer & Bennett, 1959)
Iolaus farquharsoni (Bethune-Baker, 1922)
Iolaus flavilinea (Riley, 1928)
Iolaus fontainei (Stempffer, 1956)
Iolaus frater (Joicey & Talbot, 1921)
Iolaus gemmarius (Druce, 1910)
Iolaus glaucus Butler, 1886
Iolaus handmani (Gifford, 1965)
Iolaus helenae Henning & Henning, 1989
Iolaus hemicyanus Sharpe, 1904
Iolaus iasis Hewitson, 1865
Iolaus jacksoni (Stempffer, 1950)
Iolaus kelle Stempffer, 1967
Iolaus laon Hewitson, 1878
Iolaus leonis (Riley, 1928)
Iolaus longicauda (Stempffer & Bennett, 1959)
Iolaus maesa (Hewitson, 1862)
Iolaus mafugae (Stempffer & Bennett, 1959)
Iolaus mermis (Druce, 1896)
Iolaus mimosae Trimen, 1874
Iolaus mongiro Stempffer, 1969
Iolaus moyambina (Stempffer & Bennett, 1959)
Iolaus nasisii (Riley, 1928)
Iolaus neavei (Druce, 1910)
Iolaus nolaensis (Stempffer, 1951)
Iolaus normani (Larsen, 1986)
Iolaus nursei Butler, 1896
Iolaus obscurus Aurivillius, 1923
Iolaus penningtoni (Stempffer &  Bennett, 1959)
Iolaus pollux Aurivillius, 1895
Iolaus pseudofrater Stempffer, 1962
Iolaus pseudopollux Stempffer, 1962
Iolaus sappirus (Druce, 1902)
Iolaus scintillans Aurivillius, 1905
Iolaus sciophilus (Schultze, 1916)
Iolaus sibella (Druce, 1910)
Iolaus sidus Trimen, 1864
Iolaus silanus (Grose-Smith, 1889)
Iolaus stenogrammica (Riley, 1928)
Iolaus sudanicus Aurivillius, 1905
Iolaus tajoraca Walker, 1870
Iolaus umbrosa (Butler, 1886)
Iolaus violacea (Riley, 1928)
Subgenus Aphniolaus Druce, 1902
Iolaus pallene (Wallengren, 1857)
Subgenus Philiolaus Stempffer & Bennett, 1958
Iolaus alcibiades Kirby, 1871
Iolaus calisto (Westwood, 1851)
Iolaus christofferi Collins & Larsen, 2003
Iolaus ismenias (Klug, 1834)
Iolaus laonides Aurivillius, 1898
Iolaus likpe Collins & Larsen, 2003
Iolaus lukabas Druce, 1890
Iolaus mane Collins & Larsen, 2003
Iolaus newporti Larsen, 1994
Iolaus ofere Collins & Larsen, 2008
Iolaus paneperata Druce, 1890
Iolaus parasilanus Rebel, 1914
Iolaus poecilaon (Riley, 1928)
Iolaus theodori Stempffer, 1970
Iolaus vansomereni (Stempffer &  Bennett, 1958)
Subgenus Iolaphilus Stempffer & Bennett, 1958
Iolaus aelianus Staudinger, 1891
Iolaus alexanderi Warren-Gash, 2003
Iolaus carolinae Collins & Larsen, 2000
Iolaus gabunica (Riley, 1928)
Iolaus henryi (Stempffer, 1961)
Iolaus icipe Collins & Larsen, 1998
Iolaus iulus Hewitson, 1869
Iolaus jamesoni (Druce, 1891)
Iolaus menas Druce, 1890
Iolaus schultzei Aurivillius, 1905
Iolaus shaba Collins & Larsen, 1995
Iolaus trimeni Wallengren, 1875
Subgenus Argiolaus Druce, 1891
Iolaus aequatorialis (Stempffer & Bennett, 1958)
Iolaus bergeri (Stempffer, 1953)
Iolaus caesareus Aurivillius, 1895
Iolaus cottrelli (Stempffer & Bennett, 1958)
Iolaus crawshayi (Butler, 1901)
Iolaus dianae Heath, 1983
Iolaus iturensis (Joicey & Talbot, 1921)
Iolaus kayonza (Stempffer & Bennett, 1958)
Iolaus lalos (Druce, 1896)
Iolaus manasei (Libert, 1993)
Iolaus maritimus (Stempffer & Bennett, 1958)
Iolaus montana (Kielland, 1978)
Iolaus ndolae (Stempffer & Bennett, 1958)
Iolaus pamae Heath, 1994
Iolaus silarus Druce, 1885
Iolaus silas (Westwood, [1851])
Iolaus stewarti Heath, 1985
Subgenus Pseudiolaus Riley, 1928
Iolaus lulua (Riley, 1944)
Iolaus poultoni (Riley, 1928)
Subgenus Tanuetheira Druce, 1891
Iolaus timon (Fabricius, 1787)
Subgenus Trichiolaus Aurivillius, 1898
Iolaus argentarius Butler, 1879
Iolaus mermeros (Mabille, 1878)

References

External links
"Iolaus Hübner, [1819]" at Markku Savela's Lepidoptera and Some Other Life Forms
 Seitz, A. Die Gross-Schmetterlinge der Erde 13: Die Afrikanischen Tagfalter. Plate XIII 69 et seq.

 
Iolaini
Lycaenidae genera
Taxa named by Jacob Hübner